The Coast News is an American, English language weekly newspaper published in Encinitas, California. It covers community news, events, and city government in North San Diego County.

Founded in 1987 by independent publisher Jim Kydd, the company now publishes The Coast News, The Rancho Santa Fe News, and The Inland Edition. The newspaper is known to voice its editorial opinion on community issues. For example, in 2005, Jim Kydd ran full-page ads in The Coast News opposing the controversial Proposition A, which sought to build 101 new homes on formerly agricultural land. The current managing editor is Jordan P. Ingram.

Awards
 Best Front Page 2019, Second Place, Newspaper Format awarded by the Association of Free Community Papers to The Coast News Group.
 Certificate of Special Congressional Recognition 2018 awarded to The Coast News Group by Rep. Darrell Issa (CA-49).
 Outstanding Publication 2009 awarded by the Association of Free Community Papers. AFCP judges commented that The Coast News "is full of great photography, outstanding use of color, and good editorial."
 First Place Community Service Editorial awarded by the Association of Free Community Papers to crime reporter Randy Kalp for his three-part series on heroin abuse in North San Diego County.

References

External links 

Weekly newspapers published in California
Encinitas, California
Mass media in San Diego County, California
1987 establishments in California